Sosnovsky (masculine), Sosnovskaya (feminine), or Sosnovskoye (neuter) is the name of several inhabited localities in Russia.

Urban localities
Sosnovskoye, Sosnovsky District, Nizhny Novgorod Oblast, a work settlement in Sosnovsky District of Nizhny Novgorod Oblast

Rural localities
Sosnovsky, Irkutsk Oblast, a settlement in Kuytunsky District of Irkutsk Oblast
Sosnovsky, Samara Oblast, a settlement in Kinelsky District of Samara Oblast
Sosnovsky, Voronezh Oblast, a settlement in Novopokrovskoye Rural Settlement of Novokhopyorsky District of Voronezh Oblast
Sosnovskoye, Bryansk Oblast, a village in Saltanovsky Selsoviet of Navlinsky District of Bryansk Oblast
Sosnovskoye, Kurgan Oblast, a selo in Sosnovsky Selsoviet of Shadrinsky District of Kurgan Oblast
Sosnovskoye, Nikolo-Pogostinsky Selsoviet, Gorodetsky District, Nizhny Novgorod Oblast, a village in Nikolo-Pogostinsky Selsoviet of Gorodetsky District of Nizhny Novgorod Oblast
Sosnovskoye, Zinyakovsky Selsoviet, Gorodetsky District, Nizhny Novgorod Oblast, a village in Zinyakovsky Selsoviet of Gorodetsky District of Nizhny Novgorod Oblast
Sosnovskoye, Omsk Oblast, a selo in Sosnovsky Rural Okrug of Tavrichesky District of Omsk Oblast